François Antoine Brandt (29 December 1874 – 4 July 1949) was a Dutch rower who competed at the 1900 Summer Olympics in Paris. Brandt was part of the Dutch eight team that won a bronze medal with Hermanus Brockmann as the coxswain. Brockmann also steered the boat of Brandt and Roelof Klein in the coxed pairs semifinal, which they lost to France. The pair realized that the 60 kg weight of Brockmann puts them in disadvantage; they replaced him with a local boy of 33 kg and won the final narrowly beating the French team.

Brandt had a degree in civil engineering and until 1938 worked for the Dutch railways. Later he became bishop for Belgium and Netherlands for the Liberal Catholic Church.

References

External links

1874 births
1949 deaths
Dutch male rowers
Olympic rowers of the Netherlands
Rowers at the 1900 Summer Olympics
Olympic gold medalists for the Netherlands
Olympic bronze medalists for the Netherlands
People from Zoeterwoude
Olympic medalists in rowing
Medalists at the 1900 Summer Olympics
Sportspeople from South Holland